Christopher Lillis (born October 4, 1998) is an American freestyle skier.  In the 2022 Winter Olympics, he won a gold medal in the mixed team aerials event.

He participated in Freestyle Aerial Skiing at the FIS Freestyle Ski and Snowboarding World Championships 2021, winning a medal. He is the youngest man ever to win an FIS Aerials World Cup at 17 years old. He came in first in 2016 in Minsk. He also came in first in Almaty in 2020.

His brother Jonathon Lillis competed at the 2018 Winter Olympics.

References

External links

 Chris Lillis at U.S. Ski & Snowboard

Living people
1998 births
American male freestyle skiers
Sportspeople from Rochester, New York
Freestyle skiers at the 2022 Winter Olympics
Medalists at the 2022 Winter Olympics
Olympic gold medalists for the United States in freestyle skiing